Tramadol/paracetamol, also known as tramadol/acetaminophen and sold under the brand name Ultracet, is a fixed-dose combination medication used for the treatment of moderate to severe pain. It contains tramadol hydrochloride and paracetamol. It is taken by mouth.

References

External links 
 

Combination drugs